Gustavo Cuesta Rosario (born 14 November 1988, in San Pedro de Macorís) is a Dominican Republic sprinter. He competed in the 4 × 400 m relay event at the 2012 Summer Olympics and the 400 m and 4 × 400 m at the 2016 Olympics.

Personal bests

Outdoor
100 m: 10.55 s (wind: +1.4 m/s) – Carolina, Puerto Rico, 21 March 2015
200 m: 20.71 s (wind: +1.1 m/s) – St. Martin, FRA, 9 May 2015
400 m: 45.09 s – San Jose, Costa Rica, 7 agosto 2015

Indoor
200 m: 21.16 s – Boston, United States, 8 February 2014
400 m: 45.95 s – Boston, United States, 8 February 2014

International competitions

1: Competed only in the heat.

References

External links

1988 births
Living people
Sportspeople from San Pedro de Macorís
Dominican Republic male sprinters
Olympic athletes of the Dominican Republic
Athletes (track and field) at the 2012 Summer Olympics
Athletes (track and field) at the 2016 Summer Olympics
World Athletics Championships athletes for the Dominican Republic
Athletes (track and field) at the 2011 Pan American Games
Pan American Games medalists in athletics (track and field)
Pan American Games silver medalists for the Dominican Republic
Universiade medalists in athletics (track and field)
Central American and Caribbean Games silver medalists for the Dominican Republic
Competitors at the 2010 Central American and Caribbean Games
Competitors at the 2014 Central American and Caribbean Games
Universiade gold medalists for the Dominican Republic
Central American and Caribbean Games medalists in athletics
Medalists at the 2015 Summer Universiade
Medalists at the 2011 Pan American Games
20th-century Dominican Republic people
21st-century Dominican Republic people